Dermbach is a former Verwaltungsgemeinschaft in the district Wartburgkreis in Thuringia, Germany. The seat of the Verwaltungsgemeinschaft was in Dermbach. It was disbanded in January 2019.

The Verwaltungsgemeinschaft Dermbach consisted of the following municipalities:

 Brunnhartshausen 
 Dermbach 
 Neidhartshausen 
 Oechsen 
 Stadtlengsfeld 
 Urnshausen 
 Weilar 
 Wiesenthal 
 Zella/Rhön

References

Former Verwaltungsgemeinschaften in Thuringia